Hathigadh is a village in Liliya tehsil, Amreli district, Gujarat, India. It has a High school and a Primary school. There is no river in the village, but a reservoir is under construction. There is a temple, Ramji Mandir. The village is surrounded by many big and old trees. The main occupation of the people of the village is farming.

Hathigadh has a railway station on the Dhasa–Rajula line.

References

Villages in Amreli district